is a professional Japanese baseball player. He plays outfielder for the Tokyo Yakult Swallows.

References 

1996 births
Living people
Baseball people from Osaka Prefecture
Hosei University alumni
Japanese baseball players
Nippon Professional Baseball outfielders
Tokyo Yakult Swallows players